Granger Independent School District is a public school district based in Granger, Texas.  The district has a combined High School and Elementary School serving students in grades pre-kindergarten through twelve that come from north central Williamson County.

In 2009, the school district was rated "academically acceptable" by the Texas Education Agency.

References

External links
Granger ISD

School districts in Williamson County, Texas